Spring Lake is a village in Ottawa County in the U.S. state of Michigan. The population was 2,323 at the 2010 census. The village is located within Spring Lake Township.

History

In 1837, Captain Benjamin Hopkins purchased land in the area and built a mill.  The place became known as "Hopkins Mill". In 1849, Thomas W. White and S.C. Hopkins recorded a plat with the name "Mill Point".  A post office was established with that name in May 1851. In May 1867, the post office was renamed "Spring Lake", which was also the name of a station on the Detroit, Grand Haven and Milwaukee Railway (later part of the Grand Trunk Western Railroad).  The Village of Spring Lake was incorporated in 1869. The post office continues to operate, with ZIP code 49456.

Geography

Demographics

2010 census
As of the census of 2019, there were 2,390 people, 1,107 households, and 963 families living in the village. The racial makeup of the village was 96% White, 3% African American, 0.2% Native American, 0.3% Asian, 0.1% Pacific Islander, 0.6% from other races, and 1.3% from two or more races. Hispanic or Latino of any race were 1.8% of the population.

There were 1,067 households, of which 25.8% had children under the age of 18 living with them, 48.5% were married couples living together, 8.3% had a female householder with no husband present, 2.7% had a male householder with no wife present, and 40.5% were non-families. 36.1% of all households were made up of individuals, and 17.6% had someone living alone who was 65 years of age or older. The average household size was 2.17 and the average family size was 2.84.

The median age in the village was 44.8 years. 21.6% of residents were under the age of 18; 6.3% were between the ages of 18 and 24; 22.5% were from 25 to 44; 29.1% were from 45 to 64; and 20.5% were 65 years of age or older. The gender makeup of the village was 47.0% male and 53.0% female.

2000 census
As of the census of 2000, there were 2,514 people, 1,098 households, and 666 families living in the village. The racial makeup of the village was 98.05% White, 0.32% African American, 0.44% Native American, 0.24% Asian, 0.36% from other races, and 0.60% from two or more races. Hispanic or Latino of any race were 1.31% of the population.

There were 1,098 households, out of which 25.3% had children under the age of 18 living with them, 50.5% were married couples living together, 7.6% had a female householder with no husband present, and 39.3% were non-families. 36.0% of all households were made up of individuals, and 17.7% had someone living alone who was 65 years of age or older.  The average household size was 2.16 and the average family size was 2.84.

In the village, the population was spread out, with 20.7% under the age of 18, 5.2% from 18 to 24, 25.7% from 25 to 44, 21.9% from 45 to 64, and 26.5% who were 65 years of age or older.  The median age was 44 years. For every 100 females, there were 84.2 males.  For every 100 females age 18 and over, there were 79.2 males.

The median income for a household in the village was $37,889, and the median income for a family was $44,797. Males had a median income of $34,293 versus $23,986 for females. The per capita income for the village was $26,372.  About 4.6% of families and 6.1% of the population were below the poverty line, including 6.8% of those under age 18 and 4.2% of those age 65 or over.

Notable people
Lydia J. Newcomb Comings (1850–1946), educator, lecturer, author
Winsor McCay, cartoonist, animator known for Little Nemo in Slumberland and Gertie the Dinosaur

Jack Sprague, NASCAR driver

References

External links
Village of Spring Lake

Villages in Ottawa County, Michigan
Villages in Michigan
1849 establishments in Michigan
Populated places established in 1849